"Don't Wait Too Long" is the only original track from Madeleine Peyroux's second solo album Careless Love and it was written by Peyroux herself, Jesse Harris and Larry Klein. The song was released as a single, so Rounder Records made an EP, which also contained an acoustic version of "Don't Cry Baby" (a Bessie Smith cover).
In 2006, at a concert in Moore, Peyroux was quoted saying that her "whole life is in this song".

Promotion
A video clip was also filmed. It was set on a busy street where all kinds of different people were passing by while Peyroux glanced at them. It also showed the singer playing with her guitar, possibly reminiscing her past in the streets of Europe.

In Popular Culture
In 2005, the song was featured in a Dockers commercial, a 30-second spot titled, "Hello Trolley."

The song plays over the end credits of the 2005 film Monster-In-Law, after Stevie Wonder's rendition of "For Once in My Life".

References

2004 singles
Songs written by Madeleine Peyroux
Songs written by Larry Klein
Songs written by Jesse Harris
2004 songs
Rounder Records singles